Anne Birkefeldt Ragde (born 3 December 1957) is a Norwegian novelist.

Ragde was born in Odda and made her literary debut in 1986 with the children’s book Hallo! Her er Jo! Since then, she has written several books for children and young adults, among them a biography about Sigrid Undset, for which she was awarded the Brage Prize. Her first novel for adults, En tiger for en engel was published in 1990. She has since written several novels, crime novels and short story collections. Her novel Berlin Poplars received a warm welcome from both readers and critics, and has so far sold more than 250 000 copies in Norway, and is translated to more than 15 languages. It was reviewed favorably by the Financial Times on 28 April 2008.  The sequels Hermit Crabs and Pastures Green were a no lesser success, although neither have been published in English. The trilogy has been made into a TV series, which had more than 1 million viewers when showed on Norwegian Television.

Copyright infringement scandal
In 2010 a Norwegian tabloid Dagens Næringsliv article covering ebook copyright violation, Ragde commented when asked about her own lifestyle stance to unauthorized items, that she had bought a counterfeited Prada handbag, her son Jo further added "You have a pirated MP3 collection, we copied the first 1500 songs from one place and 300 from another". Ragde had earlier in the interview expressed great concern over the online ebook file sharing and claimed "I have figured out that I’ve lost half a million kroner ($72,500) on piracy of my books, maybe more".

Selected bibliography
1986: Hallo! Her er Jo!
1987: Dumme Mamma
1990: En tiger for en engel
1995: Zona Frigida
1997: Bunnforhold
1999: En kald dag i helvete
1999: Lille Petter Ederkopp
2001: Arsenikktårnet
2002: Dr. Zellwegers gave
2003: Fosterstilling
2004: Berlin Poplars (Berlinerpoplene)
2005: Hermit Crabs (Eremittkrepsene)
2005: På bunnen av havet ligger et slott
2007: Pastures Green (Ligge i grønne enger)
2009: Nightwaves (Nattønsket)

Awards and prizes
Brage Prize 2001, for Ogsaa en ung Pige 
The Culture- and Church Department's Prize for Literature for children and Young Adults  2001, for Ogsaa en ung Pige
Riksmål Society Literature Prize 2004, for Berlin Poplars
Norwegian Booksellers' Prize 2005, for Hermit Crabs
The Norwegian Readers' Prize 2005, for Hermit Crabs

References

External links
Anne B. Ragde at Aschehoug Agency
Anne B. Ragde at Forlaget Oktober

Reviews
Berlin Poplars – Peter Carty in The Independent

1957 births
Living people
People from Odda
Norwegian children's writers
Norwegian women novelists
Norwegian crime fiction writers
20th-century Norwegian women writers
21st-century Norwegian women writers
Norwegian women children's writers
Women crime fiction writers